Tropical Depression Two was a short-lived tropical cyclone that impacted portions of Texas and Mexico during the highly active 2010 Atlantic hurricane season. It formed from a tropical wave that emerged off the western coast of Africa and crossed the Atlantic Ocean without any development. Upon entering the western Gulf of Mexico, the depression encountered a conducive environment for tropical cyclogenesis, and was designated Tropical Depression Two at 0600 UTC on July 8. Intensification into a tropical storm was initially anticipated by the National Hurricane Center (NHC), but due to its proximity to land, the depression failed to attain the status. It made landfall on South Padre Island, Texas before degenerating into a remnant low on July 9, and dissipating the following day. Due to the system's weak intensity, there were no reports of damage inflicted by winds across Texas or Mexico, although the cyclone did bring minimal rainfall totals to northern Mexico, an area severely affected by Hurricane Alex just one week previous.

Meteorological history

The origins of Tropical Depression Two can be traced back to a disorganized tropical wave that was first noted by the NHC on June 24 as it moved off the western coast of Africa, and into the Atlantic Ocean. Moving towards the west, the wave showed no signs of organization until July 3 as it entered the western Caribbean. During the 24 hours that followed, it continued to coalesce, and the NHC subsequently increased the disturbance's chance of developing into a tropical cyclone. A defined surface circulation did not form as a result of the wave's movement over the Yucatán Peninsula, and the system lost organization. The system remained disorganized as it traversed the peninsula and eventually emerged into the Gulf of Mexico on July 7. Situated over water once more, the wave was able to gradually develop as it moved in a northwesterly direction. Following a reconnaissance mission, the NHC noted in their Tropical Weather Outlook that there was a high chance of the system developing into a tropical cyclone within the next 48 hours.

Early on July 8, additional data from the hurricane hunters indicated that the system developed a closed circulation and the NHC classified it as a tropical depression at 0000 UTC, making it the second of the hurricane season. Tropical Depression Two was anticipated to intensify into a tropical storm before making landfall in Mexico; however, the depression failed to gain strength before moving inland. Following a reconnaissance mission at 1200 UTC, hurricane hunters found winds near tropical storm intensity; however, land-based observations did not support this and the depression was not classified as a tropical storm. The tropical depression weakened slightly while moving near the Texas-Mexico border, when the NHC discontinued advisories on the system. Although the NHC ceased monitoring Tropical Depression Two, the Hydrometeorological Prediction Center (HPC) issued advisories until it dissipated early on July 10, over northern Mexico.

Preparations and impact

Immediately after Tropical Depression Two was classified, a tropical storm warning was issued for the state of Texas, covering the coastline from Baffin Bay to the northern mouth of the Rio Grande. In addition, a tropical storm warning was also issued by the government of Mexico, stretching from Rio San Fernando northward also to the mouth of the Rio Grande. Subsequent coastal flooding and flash flood warnings were issued by local National Weather Service offices in southern and eastern Texas as the NHC predicted  of rain, with  locally. Alerts were also issued for the Mexican states of Tamaulipas, Nuevo León and Coahuila, where officials warned people of the potential for heavy rains, flooding, and landslides. The Sistema Nacional de Protección Civil (National Civil Protection System) raised a red alert, the highest level on the scale, for portions of Tamaulipas and noted that extreme caution was necessary in areas between Rio San Fernando and the Texas-Mexico border. After Tropical Depression Two made landfall in Texas, all of the tropical storm warnings associated with the storm were discontinued.

Portions of Mustang and Padre Island were flooded by the storm; however, damage was minimal. Two funnel clouds were reported in relation to the depression — one near Rockport and the other near Victoria. After the NHC issued their final advisory on Tropical Depression Two, the HPC began to monitor the system, recording minimal rainfall across southern and eastern Texas. As Tropical Depression Two dissipated, it moved inland and the HPC's advisories indicated that much of eastern and southern Texas experienced rainfall of at least , with the exception of Corpus Christi and Laredo. Rainfall associated with Tropical Depression Two in Texas peaked at  along the Guadalupe River adjacent to the city of Victoria. Throughout Tamaulipas, Mexico, relatively little rain fell in relation to the depression. Matamoros recorded rainfall for roughly two hours before the system passed through the region. The resulting floods from Alex and the depression caused nearly $80 million in losses throughout the region.

See also

 2010 Atlantic hurricane season
 Timeline of the 2010 Atlantic hurricane season
 Hurricane Alex (2010)

References

External links

NHC's advisory archive on Tropical Depression Two
Hydrometeorological Prediction Center's advisory archive on Tropical Depression Two

02 2010
02 2010
02 2010
02 2010
2